Edmondiidae is a family of bivalves belonging to the order Adapedonta.

Genera:
 Cardiomorpha de Koninck, 1842
 Edmondia de Koninck, 1841
 Globicarina Waterhouse, 1965
 Notomya M'Coy, 1847
 Scaldia Ryckholt, 1852

References

Unassigned Euheterodonta
Bivalve families